Thomas Cowan (born 28 August 1969) is a Scottish former footballer who played as a defender.

During his career he played for Clyde, Rangers, Sheffield United, Stoke City, Huddersfield Town, Burnley, Cambridge United, Peterborough United, York City, Dundee, Carlisle United, Barrow, Workington, Hucknall Town, Stalybridge Celtic, Hyde United and Retford United.

Career
Cowan was born in Bellshill and began his career with Holytown Colts and Netherdale Boys Club before joining Clyde in 1988; he spent most of the 1988–89 season playing for Clyde while also working in a Lanarkshire steelworks and was then signed by Rangers before the end of that campaign, at the end of which the Glasgow club won the Scottish Premier Division.

Cowan was at Ibrox for another two years, both of which also ended in championship success, but was competing for a place with the experienced Stuart Munro and fellow youngster Chris Vinnicombe and had only a peripheral role. He did feature in the European Cup against Bayern Munich in Germany (the team having lost at home in the first leg), and in what proved to be his final appearance, took part in the title decider in 1991 when a depleted Rangers squad defeated Aberdeen 2–0; however he suffered a broken leg during the match (attempting to play on with the injury for several minutes before being substituted) and the club then signed the left back of the opposition on that day, David Robertson, to fill the position.

He next moved to English club Sheffield United, and played in 24 matches in 1991–92 as the Blades finished 9th in the Football League First Division. They finished in 14th position in 1992–93 (the inaugural season of the new Premier League) with Cowan playing in 25 matches. He lost his place in the side under Dave Bassett and joined Stoke City on loan in 1993–94. He played 18 matches for Stoke, 14 of which came in the league. Cowan joined Huddersfield Town, initially on loan in March 1994, and then permanent for a fee of £150,000 in July 1994.

Cowan enjoyed the most successful period of his career with the Terriers as he made 155 appearances for the club in six seasons (including one in which he did not play at all after rupturing the anterior cruciate ligament in his knee), helping them gain promotion in 1994–95 and reach the 1994 Football League Trophy Final where they lost on penalties to Swansea City. He then had short spells at Burnley, Cambridge United, Peterborough United (scoring once against Wrexham) and York City (scoring once against Bury).

He returned to Scotland in August 2003, joining Dundee. He made his debut for Dundee on 31 August against Kilmarnock and scored on his second appearance in a 2–0 victory over Aberdeen on 20 September. However, after making six appearances for the club his contract was terminated after Dundee entered administration and he joined Carlisle United on 27 November 2003. His first season ended with the Cumbrian club being relegated to the Conference National, though he did help them gain an instant return to the Football League as they beat Stevenage Borough in the play-off final. He decided not to sign a new deal at Brunton Park and was released at the end of the season.

After leaving Carlisle, Cowan joined Barrow in the Conference North. From there he played for Workington, Hucknall Town and Stalybridge Celtic.

After football
After retiring from playing, Cowan became a firefighter and joined the South Yorkshire Fire and Rescue Service, speaking of the profession's collective ethos and camaraderie as being similar to his experience as a footballer.

Career statistics
Sourced from 

A.  The "Other" column constitutes appearances and goals in the Anglo-Italian Cup, Conference National play-offs, Football League Trophy, Football League play-offs, Full Members Cup and UEFA Cup.

Honours
Rangers
Scottish Football League Premier Division: 1988–89, 1989–90, 1990–91 

Huddersfield Town
 Football League Trophy runner-up: 1993–94

Carlisle United
 Conference National play-offs: 2005

Individual 
PFA Team of the Year: 1994–95 Second Division
 Huddersfield Town Player of the Year: 1995–96, 1996–97

References

External links

Profile at UpThePosh! The Peterborough United Database

Scottish footballers
1969 births
Clyde F.C. players
Rangers F.C. players
Sheffield United F.C. players
Stoke City F.C. players
Huddersfield Town A.F.C. players
Burnley F.C. players
Cambridge United F.C. players
Peterborough United F.C. players
York City F.C. players
Dundee F.C. players
Carlisle United F.C. players
Barrow A.F.C. players
Workington A.F.C. players
Hucknall Town F.C. players
Stalybridge Celtic F.C. players
Hyde United F.C. players
Living people
Premier League players
English Football League players
Scottish Football League players
Scottish Premier League players
Association football defenders